Stéphanie Foretz Gacon and Kristina Mladenovic were the defending champions, but Mladenovic chose not to participate. Foretz Gacon partnered up with Julie Coin, but they lost in the first round to Magda Linette and Katarzyna Piter.

Catalina Castaño and Mervana Jugić-Salkić won the title, defeating Petra Cetkovská and Renata Voráčová in the final, 6–4, 6–4.

Seeds

Draw

References 
 Main draw

Open GDF Suez Nantes Atlantique - Doubles